John Russell Darbyshire (12 October 1880 – 30 June 1948) was an Anglican bishop.

Life and ministry 
He was born in Birkenhead in Cheshire in 1880, the son of Edward and Matilda Darbyshire, and educated at Dulwich College and Emmanuel College, Cambridge. Ordained deacon in 1904 and priest in 1905, his first post was as a Curate at St Andrew the Less, Cambridge after which he was Vice-Principal of Ridley Hall, Cambridge. Later he was Vicar of St Luke, Liverpool  then a Canon Residentiary at Manchester Cathedral. From 1922 to 1931 he was Archdeacon of Sheffield, his last post before his ordaination to the episcopate as Bishop of Glasgow and Galloway- a post he held until 1938. In that year he was appointed Archbishop of Cape Town.

He was created a sub-prelate of the Order of St John of Jerusalem in 1938.

He visited England to attend the Lambeth Conference in 1948, and died in London on 30 June 1948. He never married.

A set of iron gates were erected in his memory at St. George's Cathedral, Cape Town.

Bibliography
 The Christian Faith and some Alternatives (1921)
 Our Treasury of Prayer and Praise (1926)
 Jesus, the Messiah in the Gospels (1933)

Notes

1880 births
1948 deaths
People from Birkenhead
People educated at Dulwich College
Alumni of Emmanuel College, Cambridge
Staff of Ridley Hall, Cambridge
Archdeacons of Sheffield
Bishops of Glasgow and Galloway
Anglican archbishops of Cape Town
20th-century Anglican archbishops
Sub-Prelates of the Venerable Order of Saint John
20th-century Scottish Episcopalian bishops